For information on all University of Louisiana at Monroe sports, see Louisiana–Monroe Warhawks
The Louisiana–Monroe Warhawks men's basketball (formerly the Northeast Louisiana Indians) program represents intercollegiate men's basketball at the University of Louisiana at Monroe. The school competes in the West Division of the Sun Belt Conference in Division I of the National Collegiate Athletic Association (NCAA) and play home games at the Fant–Ewing Coliseum in Monroe, Louisiana. Former ULM player and alum Keith Richard is in his 13th season as head coach in 2022–23 after signing a contract extension through the 2022–23 season on February 14, 2019.

History

Conference membership history
1951–1971: Gulf States Conference
1971–1978: Independent
1978–1982: Atlantic Sun Conference
1982–2006: Southland Conference
2006–present: Sun Belt Conference

Coaches

All-time conference record

Postseason results
All of their appearances were when the school was still known as Northeast Louisiana and their mascot was the Indians.

NCAA tournament results
The Warhawks have appeared in the NCAA tournament seven times. Their combined record is 0–7.

NAIA Tournament results
The Warhawks have appeared in the NAIA Tournament one time. Their record is 1–1.

NIT results
The Warhawks have appeared in the National Invitation Tournament (NIT) two times. Their combined record is 0–2.

CBI results
The Warhawks have appeared in the College Basketball Invitational (CBI) one time. Their record is 3–2.

CIT results
The Warhawks have appeared in the CollegeInsider.com Postseason Tournament (CIT) three times. Their combined record is 1–3.

See also
List of NCAA Division I men's basketball programs

References

External links